Publius may refer to:

Roman name
 Publius (praenomen)
 Ancient Romans with the name:
 Publius Valerius Publicola (died 503 BC), Roman consul, co-founder of the Republic
Publius Clodius Pulcher (c. 93 BC – 52 BC), Republican politician
Publius Cornelius Scipio (died 211 BC), Roman consul
Publius Quinctilius Varus (46 BC – 9 AD), Roman general and politician, who commanded the legions in Battle of the Teutoburg Forest
Publius Clodius Thrasea Paetus (died 66 AD), senator during Nero's reign
Publius Aelius Fortunatus, Roman painter in the 2nd century AD
Publius Servilius Casca Longus, better known as Servilius Casca (died 42 BC), Roman tribune and one of the assassins of Julius Caesar
Publius Aelius Hadrianus, the Emperor Hadrian (76–138 AD)
Publius Cornelius Lentulus Spinther, Roman patrician contemporary with Julius Caesar
Publius Cornelius Tacitus (56 AD – after 117), better known as Tacitus, a senator and a historian of the Roman Empire
Publius Helvius Pertinax (126–193), better known as Pertinax, Roman Emperor for three months in 193
Publius Licinius Egnatius Gallienus (c. 218 – 268), better known as Gallienus, Roman Emperor with his father Valerian from 253 to 260 and alone from 260 to 268
Publius Licinius Valerianus (193/195/200 – 260 or 264), better known as Valerian, Roman Emperor from 253 to 259
Publius Ovidius Naso (43 BC – 17/18 AD), better known as Ovid, Roman poet
Publius Papinius Statius (c. 45 – c. 96 AD), better known as Statius, a Roman poet
Publius Rutilius Rufus (158 – after 78 BC), a Roman statesman, orator and historian
Publius Salvius Julianus Aemilianus (c. 110 – c. 170), better known as Salvius Julianus, a Roman jurist, public official, and politician
Publius Septimius Geta (189–211), a Roman Emperor co-ruling with his father Septimius Severus and his older brother Caracalla from 209 to his death
Publius Sulpicius Quirinius (c. 51 BC – 21 AD), also known as Quirinius, a Roman aristocrat
Publius Sulpicius Rufus (c. 121 BC – 88 BC), an orator and statesman of the Roman Republic
Publius Terentius Afer (195/185–159 BC), better known in English as Terence, was a playwright of the Roman Republic
Publius Terentius Varro Atacinus (82 BC – c. 35 BC), better known as Varro Atacinus, a Roman poet
Publius Vergilius Maro  (70–19 BC), better known as Virgil in English, a Roman poet

Other uses 
 Saint Publius (33 – c. 112), first Christian bishop of Malta
 Publius, a pseudonym used by James Madison, Alexander Hamilton and John Jay in writing The Federalist Papers
 Publius (journal), an academic journal subtitled The Journal of Federalism
 Publius (publishing system), an attempted communication protocol for anonymous and censorship-resistant communication
 Publius Enigma, an Internet phenomenon involving a riddle proposed in connection with the 1994 Pink Floyd album The Division Bell

See also